Barry Charles Divola is an Australian journalist, columnist and author.

Birth and family
Divola was born in Sydney, the first son of Kevin Divola. He was educated at Newington College. He lives in Perth, Western Australia, with his wife and two young daughters.

Writing career
Divola is a regular contributor to The Sydney Morning Herald and was a columnist and feature writer for that newspaper's monthly publication, (sydney) magazine, where he presented the columns Street Life and Hole in the Wall. He was the music critic for Who, a senior writer for Rolling Stone and contributor to Madison and Entertainment Weekly.

Bibliography

Books

 M is for Metal : The loudest alphabet book on earth (with Paul McNeil) – ABC Books, (Syd, 2006)  
 The Secret Life of Backpackers : A bunk's-eye view of the tourist trail from Bondi to Cairns – ABC Books, (Syd, 2008) 
 Nineteen Seventysomething – Affirm Press, (2010)

Essays and reporting

Album reviews

Awards
He won the Banjo Paterson Award for short fiction in 2004, 2005 and 2006 for his stories Nipple, Cicada Boy and Nixon.

References

1959 births
Living people
People educated at Newington College
Australian freelance journalists
Rolling Stone people
The Sydney Morning Herald people